The 2022 CVBL season is the 2nd season of the Cabo Verde Basketball League (CVBL) and the first under its new name. The Plateau Warriors were the defending champions. The season began on June 12 and ended July 31, 2022.

Mindelo Monstro won the title after beating Txada Panthers 2–0 in the best-of-three finals.

Draft 
The 2022 CVBL draft was held on June 1, 2022 and drafted 20 international players.

Teams 
Two new teams entered the league: Mindelo Monster and Sal Turtles. They were the first teams from São Vicente and Sal to play in the league.

Playoffs

Bracket

Finals

Individual awards 

 Most Valuable Player: Julius Chamble (Mindelo Monstro)
 Defensive Player of the Year: Aluizio Correia (Txada Panthers)
 Rookie of the Year: Gabriel Correia (Sal Turtles)

Statistics

References 

Basketball in Cape Verde
2022 in African basketball